In a Model Room is the debut album of Japanese band P-Model. It was an electronic pop album, released in 1979 under the label, Warner Bros.

Background

By 1978, Susumu Hirasawa, guitarist and vocalist of Mandrake, one of the few Japanese progressive metal bands at the time, was unsatisfied with the style the band worked in, feeling that progressive rock had lost its social relevance and became solely for entertainment. By then, Mandrake's only achievements were a devoted but extremely niche following by fans of Japanese progressive rock fans (who, by Hirasawa's estimate, totaled at only a few hundred people), and bit parts on releases by an all-synth band they'd befriended.

Around this time, the punk rock/new wave movements started in the west; experiencing these new forms of presenting concepts and visuals through music via promotional videos; most of the band went through a drastic change in outlook towards music, and started to write songs and gradually change their look accordingly.

Mandrake had turned into a half-hearted band and, after declining an offer to sign with Victor Music Industries, Hirasawa decided to "abort" Mandrake, characterizing it as the defeat to commercialism. The band's final live performance was a three-hour show at the Shibuya Jean-Jean, meant to be the symbolic burial of Mandrake's aborted body.

On New Year's Day 1979, the members of the band held a meeting to decide how they would reform. Bassist Tohru Akutu, still attached to progressive rock, decided to depart from the band. The instruments which "emitted a pretentious grandeur" (most of them painted in dignified colors like purple, gold and burgundy) were either repainted in bright colors (like yellow, light blue and pink) or sold off to buy ones more adequate for what the band envisioned. It was decided that their name would be changed to something that evoked the new development of a mass-produced industrial good.

Composition and Production
Most of the songs on the album were created by Mandrake late in the group's existence, which allowed for a quick debut release. The songs show a tendency for complex compositions and unusual time signatures. The lyrics reflect on the sociopolitical issues of Japan at the time, during the Japanese post-war economic miracle, and were influenced in part by Nineteen Eighty-Four.

In a Model Room was produced by Masahide Sakuma, keyboardist of the new wave band Plastics with studio experience from being in the progressive rock band , who agreed to do so on the strength of the album's first track. Described by Hirasawa as "an honest man who acted with a life-sized air of cleanliness", Sakuma was swiftly trusted by the band, who were cautious with making their debut. Producing for the first time outside of his band, Sakuma went on to become a renowned session producer.

The instrumentation is a mix of standard punk with electronic devices for mechanical tones: A Roland CR-68 drum machine  does simultaneous beats alongside a standard drum kit; the Maxi-Korg 800DV synthesizer was used for a unique blipping noise, dubbed by the music press as a "musical stapler". P-Model came to argue with Warner-Pioneer, Sakuma and engineer Makoto Furukawa daily over their instruments: The band picked them because they felt a rough sound was crucial to their theme, the production thought it all sounded bad. Ultimately, P-Model compromised on most aspects of the recording.

Hirasawa re-recorded the album (with the exception of "Sophisticated") in 1999 as Virtual Live-1 [P-Model Live at Roppongi S-Ken Studio 1979].

Legacy
In 2007 Rolling Stone Japan ranked it at number 52 in its list of the 100 Greatest Japanese Rock Albums of All Time and Snoozer ranked it at number 125 in its list of the 150 Greatest Albums of Japanese Rock 'n' Roll. Polysics covered "The Great Brain" for the 2007 album Karate House and have performed "Art Mania" live. A cover of "Art Mania" using Kagamine Rin is included on the Hatsune Miku sings NEW WAVE cover album.

Track listing

The figure of "Art Mania" is a modification of a phrase from the 1952 Poly e Seus Modernistas song "Turista" (written by ), based on a 1963 cover by The Atlantics. "The Great Brain" is a reworking of a section of the 1973 Mandrake song   (officially unreleased at the time, credited to Fumiyasu Abe when released on 1997's Unreleased Materials vol. 1). "White Cigarettes" contains an interpolation of the Arabian riff (believed to originate from a 17th century traditional Algerian song, published as part of various other compositions by various other musicians over time).

Two other songs were considered for the album: The Hirasawa-penned  and the Tanaka piece . The former, at times part of Mandrake setlists, was considered too heavy and "not the sound you want out of a pink album"; it was later recorded, with new parts by Tanaka, for Landsale. The latter was first publicly released as BGM for the end credits of the Photon-1 video in 1989.

Personnel
 P-Model - Production, Arrangements
Susumu Hirasawa - Vocals, Guitar, Synthesizer, Jacket Design
Yasumi Tanaka - Combo organ, Synthesizers, Sequencer, Backing vocals
Sadatoshi Tainaka - Drums, Drum machine
Katsuhiko Akiyama  - Bass, Synthesizer, Backing vocals

 Staff
Masahide Sakuma - "Switchist", Production
Tomonari Sassa - Direction
Makoto Furukawa - Engineering, Mixing
Kozo Kenmochi, Kenji Konno & Ryuichi Suzuki - Assistant Engineering
Yūichi Hirasawa - Lyrics, Art director
Hideki Namai - Photography
Special Thanks to: Hisaaki Katoh, Nobumasa Uchida, Yūichi Hirasawa, Hiroshi Yamamoto, Daiji Okai, Sunshine City Gals, Ms. Shirota

Release history

"Roomrunner" is included on the GET THE PUNK -J PUNK & NEW WAVE 1972～1991- various artists compilation.
"Art Mania" is included on the ROCK is LOFT　-Purple Disc- ～SHINJUKU LOFT 30th Anniversary～, TECHNOLOID -JAPANESE 80's NEW WAVE SAMPLER-, Rock NIPPON～Selected by Hiroshi Tsuchiya, KING SONGS of NEW WAVE and SAKUMA DROPS compilation albums.
The album's singles were reissued on CD on paper sleeves to replicate their original packaging with the band's other Warner-Pioneer released singles as part of the Tower Records exclusive Warner Years Singles Box box set in 2012.

References

External links
 IN A MODEL ROOM at NO ROOM - The official site of Susumu Hirasawa (P-MODEL)
 
 IN A MODEL ROOM at SS RECORDINGS Official Site

1979 debut albums
P-Model albums
Japanese-language albums
Warner Music Japan albums